Marcos Rosendo Medina Filigrana (born 6 October 1970) is a Mexican politician affiliated with the PRD. He served as Deputy of the LXII Legislature of the Mexican Congress representing Tabasco.

References

1970 births
Living people
Politicians from Tabasco
Party of the Democratic Revolution politicians
21st-century Mexican politicians
Deputies of the LXII Legislature of Mexico
Members of the Chamber of Deputies (Mexico) for Tabasco